A gimlet is a hand tool for drilling small holes, mainly in wood, without splitting.  It was defined in Joseph Gwilt's Architecture (1859) as "a piece of steel of a semi-cylindrical form, hollow on one side, having a cross handle at one end and a worm or screw at the other".

A gimlet is always a small tool. A similar tool of larger size is called an auger. The cutting action of the gimlet is slightly different from an auger and the initial hole it makes is smaller; the cutting edges pare away the wood, which is moved out by the spiral sides, falling out through the entry hole. This also pulls the gimlet farther into the hole as it is turned; unlike a bradawl, pressure is not required once the tip has been drawn in.

Modern French uses the term , also the French for "tendril".

Use as a metaphor 
The term is also used figuratively to describe something as sharp or piercing, and also to describe the twisting, boring motion of using a gimlet. The term gimlet-eyed can mean sharp-eyed or squint-eyed (one example of this use is Major General Smedley Darlington Butler, who was known as "Old Gimlet Eye").

Further reading
 Adamson, John, "Gimlets galore!", Furniture & Cabinetmaking, no. 265, Winter 2017, pp. 50–3
 Hawley, Ken, & Watts, Dennis (2017), Gimlet Patterns and Manufacture Sheffield: The Hawley Collection Trust Ltd in association with the Tools and Trades History Society

References

Woodworking hand tools
Hole making

de:Bohrer#Nagelbohrer